Midzhakh is a rural locality (a selo) in Smugulsky Selsoviet, Akhtynsky District, Republic of Dagestan, Russia. The population was 154 as of 2010.

Geography 
Midzhakh is located 12 km southwest of Akhty (the district's administrative centre) by road. Smugul is the nearest rural locality.

References 

Rural localities in Akhtynsky District